Crazy for You may refer to:

Music 
 Crazy for You (musical), a 1992 musical comedy featuring the music of George and Ira Gershwin

Albums 
 Crazy for You (Best Coast album)
 Crazy for You (David Hasselhoff album) (1990)
 Crazy for You (John Hicks album) (1992)
 Crazy for You (Earl Klugh album)

Songs 
 "Crazy for You" (Hedley song)
 "Crazy for You" (Let Loose song)
 "Crazy for You" (Madonna song)
 "Crazy 4 U", a song by Kumi Koda
 "Crazy for You", a song by Adele from 19
 "Crazy for You", a song by Alexia from The Party
 "Crazy for You", a song by Hadise from Düm Tek Tek
 "Crazy for You", a song by David Hasselhoff
 "Crazy for You", a song by Incognito
 "Crazy for You", a song by NSYNC from 'N Sync
 "Crazy for You", a song by Pizza Girl from ParaParaParadise
 "Crazy for You", a song by Slowdive from  Pygmalion
 "Crazy for You", a song by Eboni Foster

Other uses 
 Crazy for You (TV series), a Philippine soap opera
 Vision Quest (film), or Crazy for You, a 1985 film starring Matthew Modine and Linda Fiorentino
 Crazy for You, a shōjo manga by Karuho Shiina
 "Crazy for You" (The Flash), an episode of The Flash